Allée des Acacias, in the Bois de Boulogne is a 1908 gouache on card painting of a car on a strete in the Bois de Boulogne by Roger de La Fresnaye, now in the musée Carnavalet. It was once used on a poster promoting cars made by the painter's brother.

References

1908 paintings
Paintings in the collection of the Musée Carnavalet
French paintings